Space Shuttle: A Journey into Space is a space flight simulator game designed by Steve Kitchen for the Atari 2600 and published by Activision in 1983. It is one of the first realistic spacecraft simulations available for home systems.  Space Shuttle was adapted to the Atari 8-bit family and Atari 5200  by Bob Henderson (1984), then ported to the ZX Spectrum (1984), Commodore 64 (1984), Amstrad CPC (1986), and MSX (1986). The 1984 Activision Software catalog also mentions an Apple II version.

The player controls the most critical flight phases of the Space Shuttle such as launch, stabilizing orbit, docking, deorbit burn, reentry, and landing, each with its own set of instructions to follow. The original Atari 2600 version came with an overlay since it made use of all the switches.

Reception
In an April 1984 review for Video Games magazine, Dan Persons wrote:
Space Shuttle is not a game for everybody. It requires a considerable amount of patience and, perhaps not too surprisingly, a considerable amount of brainpower. Players who seek the visceral thrills of the standard shoot'em-up may ultimately find this simulation's complexity frustrating. But those of you who are ready for a richer, more sophisticated experience will probably recognize Space Shuttle for the monumental achievement it is.

References

External links
Review in GAMES Magazine

1983 video games
Activision games
Amstrad CPC games
Atari 2600 games
Atari 5200 games
Atari 8-bit family games
Cancelled Apple II games
Commodore 64 games
MSX games
Realistic space simulators
Space flight simulator games
ZX Spectrum games
Video games developed in the United States